Ruminiai is a village in Kėdainiai district municipality, in Kaunas County, in central Lithuania. It is located nearby Jonava-Šeduva route and Lithuanian geographical center. According to the 2011 census, the village has a population of 11 people.

Demography

References

Villages in Kaunas County
Kėdainiai District Municipality